Lipova or Lipová may refer to places:

Czech Republic
Lipová (Cheb District), a municipality and village in the Karlovy Vary Region
Lipová (Děčín District), a municipality and village in the Ústí nad Labem Region
Lipová (Přerov District), a municipality and village in the Olomouc Region
Lipová (Prostějov District), a municipality and village in the Olomouc Region
Lipová (Zlín District), a municipality and village in the Zlín Region
Lipová-lázně, a municipality and village in the Olomouc Region
Horní Lipová, a village in the municipality
Lipová, a village and part of Chuderov in the Ústí nad Labem Region
Lipová, a village and part of Volfířov in the South Bohemian Region

Romania
Lipova, Arad, a town in Arad County
Lipova, Bacău, a commune in Bacău County
Lipova (river), a river

Slovakia
Lipová, Nitra Region, a municipality and village in the Nitra Region
Lipová, Prešov Region, a municipality and village in the Prešov Region

Serbia
Lipova (Vrnjačka Banja)

See also
Lippa (disambiguation)